Keir Giles (born 26 January 1968) is a British writer. Giles is an expert on security issues affecting Russia, and on the Armed Forces of the Russian Federation. He was educated at Orley Farm School and Winchester College.

Giles is a research director with the Conflict Studies Research Centre.

Before his academic career, Giles undertook pilot training with the Royal Air Force and worked as an actor with Gorky Film Studios, appearing in A Captive in the Land and other productions.

References

External links
 CSRC Ltd website
 
 Keir Giles publications through NATO Defense College
 Keir Giles on International Relations and Security Network
 Keir Giles on Google Scholar

1968 births
Living people
People educated at Winchester College
Chatham House people